The 2000 UCLA Bruins baseball team represented the University of California, Los Angeles in the 2000 NCAA Division I baseball season. The team played their home games in Jackie Robinson Stadium. The Bruins finished the season with a 38–26 overall record. With a 17–7 conference record, UCLA shared the Pacific-10 Conference Championship with Arizona and Stanford. The team qualified for the 2000 NCAA Division I baseball tournament, and were seeded #1 in the Oklahoma City Regional. The Bruins beat Delaware and Oklahoma to reach the regional finals. UCLA again played the Oklahoma Sooners in the finals, and beat them 11–3 to advance to the Baton Rouge Super Regionals. The Bruins faced the LSU Tigers, who were the #1 seed from the Baton Rouge Regional. UCLA lost the first game of the series 2–8, and lost the second game 8–14. LSU went on to win the 2000 College World Series, and never lost a game in the entire tournament.

UCLA set the NCAA record for most players drafted from a university in a single season when 12 players were picked in the 2000 Major League Baseball Draft.

Schedule 

! style="" | Regular Season: 35-24
|- valign="top" 

|- align="center" bgcolor="#ddffdd"
| February 3 || at Hawaii || No. 4 || Rainbow Stadium || W 15–3 || M. Kunes (1–0) || R. Ho (1–2) || None || 2,145 || 1–0 || –
|- align="center" bgcolor="#ddffdd"
| February 4 || at Hawaii || No. 4 || Rainbow Stadium || W 10–3 || J. Brandt (1–0) || R. Snider (1–2) || None || 2,421 || 2–0 ||–
|- align="center" bgcolor="#ddffdd"
| February 5 || at Hawaii || No. 4 || Rainbow Stadium || W 9–3 || J. Karp (1–0) || C. Giannetti (0–2) || None || 2,340 || 3–0 ||–
|- align="center" bgcolor="#ddffdd"
| February 9 || UC Santa Barbara || No. 4 || Jackie Robinson Stadium || W 17–4 || B. Roe (1–0) || B. Cain (2–1) || None || 445 || 4–0 || –
|- align="center" bgcolor="#ffdddd"
| February 11 || at UNLV || No. 4 || Earl Wilson Stadium || L 5–21 || J. Maruffi (1–1) || J. Brandt (1–1) || None || 407 || 4–1 || –
|- align="center" bgcolor="#ddffdd"
| February 12 || at UNLV || No. 4 || Earl Wilson Stadium || W 10–1 || J. Karp (2–0) || G. Pupo (0–1) || None || 594 || 5–1 || –
|- align="center" bgcolor="#ddffdd"
| February 13 || at UNLV || No. 4 || Earl Wilson Stadium || W 6–5 || R. Henkel (1–0) || L. Anderson (1–2) || C. Cislak (1) || 581 || 6–1 || –
|- align="center" bgcolor="#ffdddd"
| February 15 || at Loyola Marymount || No. 2 || Page Stadium || L 4–5 || B. Felton (2–0) || C. Cislak (0–1) || None || 448 || 6–2 || –
|- align="center" bgcolor="#ffdddd"
| February 18 || No. 9 North Carolina || No. 2 || Jackie Robinson Stadium || L 13–17 || B.J. Finnerty (1–0) || C. Cislak (0–2) || None || 247 || 6–3 || –
|- align="center" bgcolor="#ffdddd"
| February 19 || No. 9 North Carolina || No. 2 || Jackie Robinson Stadium || L 4–6 || E. Henderson (1–0) || J. Karp (2–1) || DePriest (2) || 531 || 6–4 || –
|- align="center" bgcolor="#ffdddd"
| February 20 || No. 9 North Carolina || No. 2 || Jackie Robinson Stadium || L 11–12 || S. Autrey (2–0) || R. Henkel (1–1) || None || 348 || 6–5 || –
|- align="center" bgcolor="#ddffdd"
| February 22 || Pepperdine || No. 15 || Jackie Robinson Stadium || W 11–7 || K. Jerkens (1–0) || G. Ramirez (0–2) || None || 292 || 7–5 || –
|- align="center" bgcolor="#ffdddd"
| February 25 || at No. 16 USC || No. 15 || Dedeaux Field || L 7–10 || M. Prior (3–1) || J. Brandt (1–2) || Montrenes (1) || 634 || 7–6 || –
|- align="center" bgcolor="#ffdddd"
| February 26 || at No. 16 USC || No. 15 || Dedeaux Field || L 3–4 || T. Petke (1–0) || B. Roe (1–1) || None || 1,021 || 7–7 || –
|- align="center" bgcolor="bbbbbb"
| February 27 || at No. 16 USC || No. 15 || Dedeaux Field || colspan=8 | Postponed
|- align="center" bgcolor="#ffdddd"
| February 29 || at San Diego State || No. 24 || Tony Gwynn Stadium || L 8–9 || R. Shortell (2–0) || C. Cislak (0–3) || None || 485 || 7–8 || –
|-

|- align="center" bgcolor="#ffdddd"
| March 1 || at No. 17 Long Beach State || No. 24 || Blair Field || L 1–6 || J. Leuenberger (1–0) || J. Brandt (1–3) || None || 1,025 || 7–9 || –
|- align="center" bgcolor="#ffdddd"
| March 7 || at No. 7 Cal State Fullerton ||  || Goodwin Field || L 5–17 || J. Smith (3–1) || B. Roe (1–2) || None || 717 || 7–10 || –
|- align="center" bgcolor="#bbbbbb"
| March 8 || San Diego ||  || Jackie Robinson Stadium || colspan=8 | Postponed
|- align="center" bgcolor="#ddffdd"
| March 10 || Bradley ||  || Jackie Robinson Stadium || W 14–4 || R. Henkel (2–1) || D. Hoffman (0–2) || P. Diaz (1) || 256 || 8–10 || –
|- align="center" bgcolor="#ddffdd"
| March 11 || Bradley ||  || Jackie Robinson Stadium || W 9–8 || J. Brandt (2–3) || M. Baker (1–2) || None || 352 || 9–10 || –
|- align="center" bgcolor="#ddffdd"
| March 12 || Bradley ||  || Jackie Robinson Stadium || W 12–4 || B. Roe (2–2) || C. Hawkins (1–1) || None || 397 || 10–10 || –
|- align="center" bgcolor="#ddffdd"
| March 14 || San Diego State ||  || Jackie Robinson Stadium || W 7–6 || R. Carter (1–0) || R. Ring (1–2) || None || 202 || 11–10 || –
|- align="center" bgcolor="#ddffdd"
| March 17 || Harvard ||  || Jackie Robinson Stadium || W 9–2 || R. Henkel (3–1) || J. Nyweide (0–1) || None || 275 || 12–10 || –
|- align="center" bgcolor="#ddffdd"
| March 18 || Harvard ||  || Jackie Robinson Stadium || W 5–4 || J. Brandt (3–3) || D. Lennon (0–1) || None || 536 || 13–10 || –
|- align="center" bgcolor="#ddffdd"
| March 18 || Harvard ||  || Jackie Robinson Stadium || W 10–3 || B. Roe (3–2) || J. Birtwell (0–1) || R. Carter (1) || 536 || 14–10 || –
|- align="center" bgcolor="#ddffdd"
| March 25 || Washington ||  || Jackie Robinson Stadium || W 2–1 || R. Henkel (4–1) || M. Massingale (2–2) || None || 429 || 15–10 || 1–0
|- align="center" bgcolor="#ffdddd"
| March 26 || Washington ||  || Jackie Robinson Stadium || L 6–7 || M. Gardner (1–1) || J. Brandt (3–4) || None || 545 || 15–11 || 1–1
|- align="center" bgcolor="#ddffdd"
| March 27 || Washington ||  || Jackie Robinson Stadium || W 12–5 || B. Roe (4–2) || J. Carlsen (3–1) || None || 244 || 16–11 || 2–1
|- align="center" bgcolor="#ddffdd"
| March 29 || at San Diego ||  || John Cunningham Stadium || W 11–9 || J. Brandt (4–4) || M. Oseguera (0–2) || None || 317 || 17–11 || –
|- align="center" bgcolor="#ddffdd"
| March 31 || at Oregon State ||  || Goss Stadium at Coleman Field || W 3–1 || R. Henkel (5–1) || S. Nicholson (4–4) || None || 824 || 18–11 || 3–1
|-

|- align="center" bgcolor="#ddffdd"
| April 1 || at Oregon State ||  || Goss Stadium at Coleman Field || W 18–10 || J. Karp (3–1) || T. Johnson (2–2) || None || 1,152 || 19–11 || 4–1
|- align="center" bgcolor="#ddffdd"
| April 2 || at Oregon State ||  || Goss Stadium at Coleman Field || W 9–5 || R. Carter (2–0) || M. Newell (3–3) || None || 955 || 20–11 || 5–1
|- align="center" bgcolor="#ffdddd"
| April 4 || Loyola Marymount || No. 25 || Jackie Robinson Stadium || L 12–23 || J. Abreu (1–0) || M. Kunes (1–1) || None || 348 || 20–12 || –
|- align="center" bgcolor="#ffdddd"
| April 7 || No. 10 USC || No. 25 || Jackie Robinson Stadium || L 1–5 || R. Currier (8–2) || R. Henkel (5–2) || None || 885 || 20–13 || 5–2
|- align="center" bgcolor="#ddffdd"
| April 8 || No. 10 USC || No. 25 || Jackie Robinson Stadium || W 15–5 || J. Karp (4–1) || A. Reyes (3–4) || None || 851 || 21–13 || 6–2
|- align="center" bgcolor="#ddffdd"
| April 9 || No. 10 USC || No. 25 || Jackie Robinson Stadium || W 8–5 || B. Roe (5–2) || M. Prior (7–3) || R. Carter (2) || 1,403 || 22–13 || 7–2
|- align="center" bgcolor="#ddffdd"
| April 11 || at UC Santa Barbara || No. 15 || Caesar Uyesaka Stadium || W 10–2 || M. Kunes (2–1) || J. Gonzales (2–1) || None || 212 || 23–13 || –
|- align="center" bgcolor="#ddffdd"
| April 14 || Cal State Northridge || No. 15 || Jackie Robinson Stadium || W 10–5 || J. Karp (5–1) || A. Davidson (3–4) || R. Carter (3) || 389 || 24–13 || –
|- align="center" bgcolor="#ffdddd"
| April 15 || at Cal State Northridge || No. 15 || Matador Field || L 2–7 || B. Murphy (–) || B. Roe (5–3) || None || – || 24–14 || –
|- align="center" bgcolor="#ffdddd"
| April 16 || Cal State Northridge || No. 15 || Jackie Robinson Stadium || L 9–12 || S. Busby (1–0) || K. Jerkens (1–1) || None || 531 || 24–15 || –
|- align="center" bgcolor="#ffdddd"
| April 18 || at No. 22 USC || No. 19 || Dedeaux Field || L 2–6 || R. Flores (2–1) || C. Cislak (0–4) || T. Petke (3) || 292 || 24–16 || –
|- align="center" bgcolor="#ffdddd"
| April 20 || at No. 3 Arizona State || No. 19 || Packard Stadium || L 8–10 || T. Johnson (1–0) || J. Brandt (4–5) || E. Doble (7) || 3,011 || 24–17 || 7–3
|- align="center" bgcolor="#ddffdd"
| April 21 || at No. 3 Arizona State || No. 19 || Packard Stadium || W 13–3 || J. Karp (6–1) || C. Pennington (7–2) || None || 3,194 || 25–17 || 8–3
|- align="center" bgcolor="#ffdddd"
| April 22 || at No. 3 Arizona State || No. 19 || Packard Stadium || L 3–18 || J. Liebeck (1–0) || B. Roe (5–4) || None || 3,719 || 25–18 || 8–4
|- align="center" bgcolor="#ffdddd"
| April 24 || San Diego || No. 28 || Jackie Robinson Stadium || L 1–10 || K. Gray (3–2) || C. Cislak (0–5)|| None || 215 || 25–19 || –
|- align="center" bgcolor="#ffdddd"
| April 25 || No. 17 Cal State Fullerton || No. 28 || Jackie Robinson Stadium || L 3–8 || R. Corona (2–3) || M. Kunes (2–2) || None || 341 || 25–20 || –
|- align="center" bgcolor="#ddffdd"
| April 28 || at Washington State || No. 28 || Bailey–Brayton Field || W 14–10 || K. Jerkens (2–1) || L. McTavish (0–1) || None || 472 || 26–20 || 9–4
|- align="center" bgcolor="#ddffdd"
| April 29 || at Washington State || No. 28 || Bailey–Brayton Field || W 13–2 || J. Karp (7–1) || T. Meldahl (2–6) || M. Kunes (1) || 587 || 27–20 || 10–4
|- align="center" bgcolor="#ddffdd"
| April 30 || at Washington State || No. 28 || Bailey–Brayton Field || W 14–1 || B. Roe (6–4) || R. Rivard (0–5) || None || 436 || 28–20 || 11–4
|-

|- align="center" bgcolor="#ffdddd"
| May 2 || at Pepperdine || No. 27 || Eddy D. Field Stadium || L 6–7 || N. Lowry (5–2) || S. Arrasmith (0–1) || D. Katz (4) || 227 || 28–21 || –
|- align="center" bgcolor="#ffdddd"
| May 5 || California || No. 27 || Jackie Robinson Stadium || L 7–13 || D. Cash (8–4) || R. Carter (2–1) || None || 435 || 28–22 || 11–5
|- align="center" bgcolor="#ddffdd"
| May 6 || California || No. 27 || Jackie Robinson Stadium || W 18–7 || J. Karp (8–1) || J. Shirley (2–4) || P. Diaz (2) || 463 || 29–22 || 12–5
|- align="center" bgcolor="#ddffdd"
| May 7 || California || No. 27 || Jackie Robinson Stadium || W 8–7 || J. Brandt (5–5) || T. Hutchinson (4–4) || None || 552 || 30–22 || 13–5
|- align="center" bgcolor="#ddffdd"
| May 9 || Long Beach State || No. 29 || Jackie Robinson Stadium || W 17–6 || M. Kunes (3–2) || C. Bentz (0–2) || None || 266 || 31–22 || –
|- align="center" bgcolor="#ddffdd"
| May 13 || Arizona || No. 29 || Jackie Robinson Stadium || W 5–3 || J. Karp (9–1) || B. Diggins (9–4) || R. Carter (4) || 581 || 32–22 || 14–5
|- align="center" bgcolor="#ddffdd"
| May 14 || Arizona || No. 29 || Jackie Robinson Stadium || W 10–0 || R. Henkel (6–2) || R. Shabansky (3–5) || None || 507 || 33–22 || 15–5
|- align="center" bgcolor="#ddffdd"
| May 15 || Arizona || No. 22 || Jackie Robinson Stadium || W 8–5 || J. Brandt (6–5) || M. Meyer (1–3) || None || 448 || 34–22 || 16–5
|- align="center" bgcolor="#ddffdd"
| May 19 || at No. 2 Stanford || No. 22 || Sunken Diamond || W 10–9 || J. Brandt (7–5) || J. Bruksch (4–4) || None || 4,020 || 35–22 || 17–5
|- align="center" bgcolor="#ffdddd"
| May 20 || at No. 2 Stanford || No. 22 || Sunken Diamond || L 3–19 || J. Wayne (12–3) || R. Henkel (6–3) || None || 2,537 || 35–23 || 17–6
|- align="center" bgcolor="#ffdddd"
| May 21 || at No. 2 Stanford || No. 22 || Sunken Diamond || L 11–17 || T. Cunningham (5–1) || B. Roe (6–5) || None || 2,601 || 35–24 || 17–7
|-

! style="" | Postseason: 3–2
|- valign="top"

|- align="center" bgcolor="#ddffdd"
| May 26 || vs. (4) Delaware || (1) No. 22 || Southwestern Bell Bricktown Ball Park || W 13–12 || B. Roe (7–5) || V. Sage (4–3) || None || 2,584 || 36–24 || 1–0
|- align="center" bgcolor="#ddffdd"
| May 27 || vs. (2) No. 29 Oklahoma || (1) No. 22 || Southwestern Bell Bricktown Ball Park || W 10–5 || J. Karp (10–1) || L. Cuellar (3–3) || J. Brandt (1) || 4,865 || 37–24 ||2–0
|- align="center" bgcolor="#ddffdd"
| May 28 || vs. (2) No. 29 Oklahoma || (1) No. 22 || Southwestern Bell Bricktown Ball Park || W 11–3 || R. Carter (3–1) || A. Mix (10–2) || None || 4,144 || 38–24 ||3–0
|-

|- align="center" bgcolor="#ffdddd"
| 63 || June 2 || at (2) No. 4 LSU || No. 14 || Alex Box Stadium || L 2–8 || B. Tallet (14–3) || R. Henkel (6–4) || None || 7,624 || 38–25 ||3–1
|- align="center" bgcolor="#ffdddd"
| 64 || June 3 || at (2) No. 4 LSU || No. 14 || Alex Box Stadium || L 8–14 || B. Brian (6–2) || J. Karp (10–2) || W. Guidry (7) || 7,667 || 38–26 ||3–2
|-

UCLA Bruins in the 2000 MLB Draft 
The following members of the UCLA Bruins baseball program were drafted in the 2000 Major League Baseball Draft.

Notes 
 May 23, 2000 – Former baseball coach Art Reichle died at 86. He played football, rugby and baseball at UCLA from 1934 to 1936 and coached for more than 30 years. His players included Jackie Robinson and Chris Chambliss.

References 

UCLA Bruins
UCLA Bruins baseball seasons
Pac-12 Conference baseball champion seasons
UCLA
UCLA